Dr. Jose Fabella Memorial Hospital, the National Maternity Hospital, is a maternal and newborn tertiary hospital located in Santa Cruz, Manila in the Philippines. It also houses the Jose Fabella Memorial Hospital School of Midwifery, one of the best performing institutions recognized by the Professional Regulation Commission in the Midwife Licensure Examinations. In 2015, the World Health Organization recognized the hospital "as a role model of the World Health Organization-Western Pacific Region Office for its essential newborn care programs, which have been proven to reduce infant morbidity and mortality".

History
The Dr. Jose Fabella Memorial Hospital started as a six-bed capacity clinic called the "Maternity House" on November 9, 1920. The clinic, which was founded by then Chairman of Public Welfare Board, Dr. Jose F. Fabella, was originally located along Isabel St. in Sampaloc, Manila. It was taken over by the Public Welfare Commission in the following year. In 1922, the clinic added a pediatric section and a school of midwifery. In 1931, the control of the clinic was shifted to the Bureau of Health and again to the Bureau of Hospitals in 1947. It was in 1951 when the clinic was transferred to its present location to the Old Bilibid compound at Santa Cruz, Manila.

Unlike other Philippine government hospitals, there were no legislative act that permitted the creation of the hospital. Its present location was only legitimized by Administrative Order no. 140, which was issued by President Manuel L. Quezon on February 19, 1941. The Administrative Order recommended that the Bilibid Hospital will be used as a maternity hospital. On June 15, 1968 when the Maternity and Children's Hospital was renamed as Dr. Jose Fabella Memorial Hospital in honor of the hospital's founder. To date, it has an authorized bed capacity of 700.

The Jose Fabella Memorial Hospital School of Midwifery is housed within the hospital. It is a government institution managed by the Department of Health.

Modernization Plan
A building of the same name located at the Lung Center of the Philippines compound was erected to serve as temporary office of the hospital. A new building will then be erected under the proposed tri-medical complex in the DOH headquarters, where San Lazaro Hospital and Jose Reyes Memorial Medical Center are located.

"A Baby Factory"
The hospital is considered as a "baby factory" and ground zero of the Philippines’ overpopulation crisis. The reputation of the hospital as a baby factory is well justified as no other hospital in the country has a higher birth rate. The maternity ward at the Hospital continues to overflow with hundreds of new mothers. Not enough beds for everyone, so four or five mothers share one bed. The hospital suffers from extreme heat during the summer.

Fabella caters to the greater Manila area, and even at the height of storms and typhoons, some women would brave the floods just to come to Fabella.  This is because, compared to most hospitals (even in some provinces), Fabella is one of the most affordable places to give birth. If you can withstand the population, the heat and the rumors about baby exchanges in the ward or in the delivery room. This is a media fabrication as hospital staff know well that babies even before they are even seen by the doctor after coming out of their mothers are already attached 2 tags on the ankle and one on the wrist which makes it nearly impossible to mistake a baby. Mothers are also given these ID tags just to make sure the child is being given to the right mother. So the baby factory term is true as also back in the early 2000s there were quite a few staff members working in each area. Nowadays, there are more staff members as there are more patients also but the RN Heals program give way for more staff to stay with the veteran staff as well as the hospital's way of helping a number of fresh nursing graduates to earn their experiences as a stepping stone in case they search for greener pastures.

Areas of the hospital

Since it is a mother and baby care hospital, all wards cater to mothers and babies only. 

Ward 1 is specifically for abortion, gynecology, and oncology cases.

Ward 2 is for High-Risk mothers waiting to give birth, and are under observation due to some common pregnancy complications like hypertension, placenta-previa, abruptio placentae. Like Ward 1, Ward 2 is divided into several areas. There is the Kangaroo Mother care area.  The mothers who stay here have babies who are born underweight and need to be in the NICU. This way, the mothers can nurture their children confined to the NICU until discharge. The Maternal High Risk area usually houses patients who are hypertensive, hypokalemic or diabetic. The ICU can only accommodate a much smaller number of patients.

Caesarian patients who have fewer complications stay in Ward 3. It is the second most populous ward in the hospital, sometimes numbering more than 100 sets of mother-and-baby patients.

Patients who have normal delivery are found in Ward 4. This is the most populous ward and patients have been known to reach more than 300 pairs most especially on the "ber" (September to December) months. 

The aforementioned wards are separate from the NICU, where most of the babies are taken care shortly after birth. This area alone is divided into several smaller areas, where babies are placed depending on the patient condition and/or complication.

There is the pediatric ward located in a separate building, which is still a part of the hospital. This department caters to most pediatric cases. More specialized cases are sent to neighboring hospitals where they can be treated with better equipment and staff.

The emergency area where expectant mothers are assessed and admitted before they are sent to either the MHR, Labor room or in the wards

The OR Complex is made up of 4 operating rooms, 1 delivery room (which can accommodate 12–20 laboring patients at any given time), a Labor room with around 5–8 beds, a post-anesthesia Care Room (recovery room) which can accommodate around 5–8 patients.  The operating room mostly operates on Caesarian sections and rare gynecology cases and even rarer Pediatric cases. Pediatric cases where done by a visiting pediatric surgeon before. Consultants with mixed specializations also visit the hospital to guide the residents as this hospital is mostly a resident-reliant hospital. Usually one consultant is present at any given time to guide a specific team he/she is assigned to.

There is also an out-patient clinic in the hospital where expectant mothers undergo routine tests in order to assess fetal and mother well-being.

References

External links

 

Hospitals in Manila
Hospitals established in 1920
Buildings and structures in Santa Cruz, Manila
Maternity hospitals in the Philippines
1920 establishments in the Philippines